Agafonovo is a rural locality (a village) in Oktyabrskoye Rural Settlement, Vyaznikovsky District, Vladimir Oblast, Russia. The population was 3 as of 2010.

Geography 
Agafonovo is located 20 km southwest of Vyazniki (the district's administrative centre) by road. Zhartsy is the nearest rural locality.

References 

Rural localities in Vyaznikovsky District